The Gabrielino Trail is a United States National Recreation Trail that runs through the Angeles National Forest. Its western trailhead is at Windsor Avenue in Altadena, California, and it runs generally east/west, with its eastern end at Chantry Flat, just north of Arcadia, California.

History 

When several existing trails were renamed to make a "new" 28.5 mile (45 km) trail in 1970, in compliance with the National Trails System Act, the Forest Service announcement read as follows:

Directions 
Travelling westbound, the trail winds its way from Chantry Flat, through Big Santa Anita Canyon past Sturtevant Falls and Sturtevant's Camp, then over Newcomb's Pass into the West Fork of the San Gabriel River. The trail meets the river at Devore Campground then follows the watercourse upstream to West Fork Campground.

To this point, the Gabrielino Trail has been tracing the Silver Moccasin Trail. It is across the stream from West Fork Campground that the Silver Moccasin Trail heads up Shortcut Canyon for the San Gabriel High Country. To continue on the Gabrielino Trail, travel west to the head of the West Fork at Red Box Saddle near Mount Wilson. This is the trail's highest point.

From Red Box, the Gabrielino continues westward down the Arroyo Seco through Commodore Switzer Trail Camp, Oakwilde and Gould Mesa Campgrounds, and emerges from The Arroyo at the Jet Propulsion Laboratory. The entire route of the trail was declared open in a press release by the Forest Service August 27, 2018 Due to the 2009 Station Fire, part of the Gabrielino was closed by the USFS including the portion of the trail between Switzer down to the Arroyo Seco. With the help of a joint project from a variety of trail groups including the Mt. Wilson Bicycling Association (MWBA) and CORBA, the reopening of the trail was announced August 27, 2018.

Facilities 
Potable water is available at the Chantry Flat trailhead and at Red Box Saddle, but otherwise one must boil or filter the stream water. Very little cell phone service along the entire route.

The following is a list of Forest Service facilities along the route of the Gabrielino Trail, east to west:
 Chantry Flat Picnic Area
Cascade Picnic Area
Spruce Grove Campground
Newcomb's Pass Picnic Area
Devore Trail Camp
West Fork Campground
Valley Forge Campground
Switzer's Picnic Area
Commodore Switzer Trail Camp
Oakwilde Campground
Paul Little Picnic Area
Niño Picnic Area
Gould Mesa Campground
Teddy's Outpost Picnic Area

See also
Henninger Flats
Tongva/Gabrieliño people

References

External links

Map with elevation gain of the Gabrielino Trail
Hiking guide for Gabrielino Trail

National Recreation Trails in California
Angeles National Forest
San Gabriel Mountains
Altadena, California
San Gabriel Valley
Protected areas of Los Angeles County, California